Beata Hołub (born 19 July 1967 in Opole, Lubelskie) is a retired Polish high jumper, who competed for her native country at the 1992 Summer Olympics.

She finished tenth at the 1991 World Indoor Championships, fourth at the 1991 World Championships and eleventh at the 1992 European Indoor Championships.

International competitions

References
sports-reference

1967 births
Living people
Polish female high jumpers
Athletes (track and field) at the 1992 Summer Olympics
Olympic athletes of Poland
Sportspeople from Opole